Jones Island is an industrialized peninsula in Milwaukee, Wisconsin. It began as a marsh island between the Milwaukee and Kinnickinnic rivers, and now forms the city's inner harbor design.

History
Extensive filling and channelization of the area began in the mid-19th century when city co-founder Byron Kilbourn advocated a "straight cut" from the Milwaukee River near the Menomonee River confluence out to Lake Michigan. This channel was made in 1857 and is still in use today. Prior to that, the natural outlet for all three rivers was at the southern end of Jones Island where the Kinnickinnic now turns north to flow out of the straight cut. This area was later filled to provide railroad access.

It was initially settled by Kashubian and German immigrants in 1870, who made their living by fishing Lake Michigan. Having never officially obtained a deed for the land, they were considered squatters by the City of Milwaukee and the vast majority of them were evicted in the 1920s to make way for a shipping port as part of an inner harbor design.  The last Kashubian holdouts left the island in the early 1940s

Shipping formed around the natural inner harbor created by the rivers, but designs were made for an outer harbor. Long piers built in and on the exposed edge of Jones Island was used for a system of docking terminals. After years of false starts, changing designs, and petitioning the federal government for funding, an inner harbor design was finalized that also included improvements to the outer harbor and breakwaters.

Currently Jones Island is home to the Port of Milwaukee, the Milwaukee Metropolitan Sewerage District's primary wastewater treatment plant, and other municipal services. It also supports the Hoan Bridge, a long span bridge. The land is heavily industrialized and only contains a couple of mature trees.

Notable people 
George L. Tews, machinist, businessman, and three-time Socialist member of the Wisconsin State Assembly

See also
 Neighborhoods of Milwaukee
 Parks of Milwaukee

References

External links 
Urban Anthropology Tour: The Kashubes of Jones Island
Port of Milwaukee History
Historic Map
Jones Island on Milwaukee Neighborhoods Guide from UWM Library

Neighborhoods in Milwaukee
South Side, Milwaukee